Jaffrey may refer to:

Places
Jaffrey, New Hampshire, a town in the United States
Jaffrey (CDP), New Hampshire, the main village in the town of Jaffrey

People
Sir Thomas Jaffrey 1st Baronet (1861–1953), Scottish actuary and a prominent citizen of Aberdeen(British origin)

Jaffrey
Jaffrey is a name associated with descendants of Ja'far al-Sadiq who was a descendant of Muhammad through his daughter Fatimah bint Muhammad and Ali ibn Abu Talib.
 Jagdeep Jaffrey    (1939-2020), Indian film actor and comedian 
 Javed Jaffrey (b. 1963), Indian film actor and comedian
 Madhur Jaffrey (b. 1933), Indian film actress and food writer
 Saeed Jaffrey (1929–2015), Indian film actor
 William Jaffrey, Scottish footballer